The following is a comprehensive discography of Sodom, a German thrash metal band. Formed in 1982, they have so far released sixteen studio albums, three live albums, two compilations, a DVD, two EPs, three singles, and two demos.

The band are considered one of the three biggest Teutonic thrash metal acts, the other two being Kreator and Destruction. While the other two bands developed a sound that has influenced death metal, Sodom created a sound that has influenced many black metal bands that formed in the late 1980s and the 1990s.

Albums

Studio albums

Live albums

Compilation albums

Extended plays

Singles

Video albums

Demo albums

References
General

Specific

Heavy metal group discographies
Discographies of German artists